Modern Vices (German: Moderne Laster) is a 1924 Austrian silent drama film directed by Leopold Niernberger and starring Nora Gregor, Annemarie Steinsieck and Hugo Werner-Kahle. It is part of the tradition of silent era enlightenment films, which blended a mixture of documentary-style realism and melodrama in portrayals of social problems such as drugs.

It is also known by the alternative title of Narkotica.

Cast
 Heinz Fischer
 Nora Gregor
 Karl Günther
 Annemarie Steinsieck
 Hugo Werner-Kahle

References

Bibliography
 Robert Von Dassanowsky. Austrian Cinema: A History. McFarland, 2005.

External links

1924 films
Austrian silent feature films
Austrian black-and-white films
1924 drama films
Austrian drama films
Films about drugs
Silent drama films